Lung Khung is a commune in Bar Kaev District in northeast Cambodia. It contains four villages and has a population of 1,828. In the 2007 commune council elections, all five seats went to members of the Cambodian People's Party. Land alienation is a problem of moderate severity in Lung Khung. (See Ratanakiri Province for background information on land alienation.)

Villages

In addition to the four villages listed above, the census recorded one household of four people outside the villages.

References

Communes of Ratanakiri province